Helge Jorma Johannes Talvitie (born 23 July 1941 in Ylistaro) is a Finland sheet metal worker and politician. He was a Member of the Parliament of Finland from 1975 to 1979, representing the Finnish People's Democratic League (SKDL).

References

1941 births
Living people
People from Seinäjoki
Finnish People's Democratic League politicians
Members of the Parliament of Finland (1975–79)
Sheet metal workers